The Cabinet of Benedikt Sigurðsson Gröndal in Iceland was formed 15 October 1979.

Cabinet

Inaugural cabinet: 15 October 1979 – 8 February 1980

See also
Government of Iceland
Cabinet of Iceland

References

Benedikt Sigurdsson Grondal, Cabinet of
Benedikt Sigurdsson Grondal, Cabinet of
Benedikt Sigurdsson Grondal, Cabinet of
Cabinets established in 1979
Cabinets disestablished in 1980